Slapfish is a fast casual seafood restaurant chain founded by Andrew Gruel. Headquartered in Huntington Beach, California, as of 2018 there are over 11 locations in the Southwestern United States, with new locations opening in other states including Indiana, Maryland, Nevada, Arizona, Colorado, and Texas.

History
In May 2011, American chef Andrew Gruel founded Slapfish with a retrofitted food truck selling seafood from California and lobster from Maine. Within three months he had three food trucks in Los Angeles and Orange County.

Working directly with fishing boats to create a supply chain for seafood led to the restaurant concept. In early 2012, he raised money from family and friends to convert an old bagel shop in Huntington Beach into Slapfish's first brick-and-mortar restaurant, serving fast casual seafood. The menu has expanded significantly since its beginnings as a food truck selling three items. Slapfish serves only sustainable seafood, with a commitment certified by the Marine Stewardship Council, an organization that measures the level of seafood stocks.

As of 2017, there are seven Slapfish locations in Southern California, two company-owned and five franchised. The Lehi, Utah, location was the first outside of California, opening in March 2017, with a second Utah location opened in November 2017. In October 2017, a new franchise was opened in Albuquerque, New Mexico. In December 2017, Slapfish announced plans to open Raw Bar by Slapfish, which will serve chilled seafood and oysters next door to the flagship location in Huntington Beach. The company has also announced plans to open restaurants in Florida, the United Kingdom and South Korea.

In July 2019, they debuted their first location in the Midwest, opening a franchise in Noblesville, Indiana.

Format 
Slapfish has been described as "the Chipotle of seafood." The store concept of a self-described "modern seafood shack" is based on seafood huts typically found in Southern California and Mexico.

Locations

United States
 Glendale, Arizona
 Brea, California
 Huntington Beach, California
 Irvine, California
 Laguna Beach, California
 Los Angeles, California
 Newport Beach, California
 San Clemente, California
 San Jose, California
 Orlando, Florida
 Noblesville, Indiana
 Rockville, Maryland
 Albuquerque, New Mexico
 Lehi, Utah
 Park City, Utah
 Sandy, Utah
 Farmington, Utah
 Oklahoma City, Oklahoma
 Arlington, VA

See also
 List of seafood restaurants
 Fast casual restaurant

References

External links
 

Fast casual restaurants
Seafood restaurants in the United States
Companies based in Huntington Beach, California
2011 establishments in California